Aída Luisa Camaño Vieyto (born 7 May 1984) is a Uruguayan footballer who plays as a defender for Club Náutico (Carrasco y Punta Gorda) and the Uruguay women's national team. She also plays futsal for Club Malvín.

International career
Camaño represented Uruguay at three Copa América Femenina editions (2003, 2006 and 2014), the 2007 Pan American Games and the 2017 Copa América Femenina de Futsal.

References

External links

1992 births
Living people
Women's association football defenders
Uruguayan women's footballers
Uruguay women's international footballers
Pan American Games competitors for Uruguay
Footballers at the 2007 Pan American Games
Colón F.C. players
Uruguayan women's futsal players